Heliopsis gracilis is a North American species of flowering plant in the family Asteraceae, known by the common names smooth oxeye and pinewoods oxeye. It is native to the southeastern and south-central United States from eastern Texas to South Carolina.

The plant generally produces 1-5 flower heads per stem. Each head contains 6-19 bright yellow ray florets surrounding 40 or more yellowish-brown disc florets. The fruit is an achene about 5 mm long.

References

External links
 Florida Native Plant Society, Heliopsis helianthoides var. gracilis, smooth oxeye photos

gracilis
Flora of the Southern United States
Plants described in 1840